Charles Henry Waller (1840–1910) was a Church of England minister, evangelical theologian and teacher.

Biography
Born at Ettingshall in Staffordshire (now part of Wolverhampton) on 23 November 1840, Waller was the eldest son of Stephen R. Waller, vicar of Ettingshall. His grandfather, the Rev. Harry Waller of Hall Bam, Beaconsfield, was descended from Edmund Waller, a seventeenth-century English poet. His mother was eldest daughter of the Rev. Charles Richard Cameron and Lucy Lyttelton Cameron, writer of religious tales for children, whose elder sister was Mary Martha Sherwood, an author.

Educated at Bromsgrove School, he matriculated on 4 June 1859 at University College, Oxford, and held a scholarship there (1859–64). He took a first class in classics and a second in mathematical moderations in 1861, and a second in literae humaniores, and a third in mathematical finals in 1863, graduating B.A. in 1863; M.A. in 1867; B.D. and D.D. in 1891. He also won the Denyer and Johnson theological scholarship on its first award in 1866. Ordained deacon in 1864, and priest in 1865, he became curate of St. Jude, Mildmay Park, under William Pennefather. In 1865, on the recommendation of Canon A. M. W. Christopher of Oxford, he began his long service to the theological college, St. John's Hall, Highbury, as tutor under Dr. T. P. Boultbee. He served in addition as reader or curate on Sundays at Christ Church, Down Street (1865-9), and at Curzon Chapel, Mayfair, in 1869, under A. W. Thorold, and was minister of St. John's Chapel, Hampstead from 1870 to 1874. He became McNeile professor of biblical exegesis at St. John's Hall in 1882, and principal from 1884, on Boultbee's death, until his retirement on a pension in 1898. Of some 700 of his pupils at St. John's Hall, the majority entered the ministry of the Church of England.

A pronounced evangelical, he acted as examining chaplain to Bishop J. C. Ryle. At Oxford he had come under the influence of John William Burgon, and through life his main interest lay in the conservative study and interpretation of the Scriptures, on which he wrote much. He married, at Heckington, Lincolnshire, on 22 July 1865, Anna Maria, daughter of the Rev. James Stubbs and together they had four sons (three in holy orders) and three daughters (one a C.M.S. missionary at Sigra, Benares).

He died on 9 May 1910 at Little Coxwell, Faringdon, Berkshire, and was buried there.

Publications
The Names on the Gates of Pearl, and other Studies, 1875; 3rd edition 1904.
A Grammar and Analytical Vocabulary of the Words in the Greek Testament, 2 parts, 1877-8. Part 1, Part 2.
The volumes on Deuteronomy and Joshua in Ellicott's Commentary, 1882. Deuteronomy
The Authoritative Inspiration of Holy Scripture, as distinct from the Inspiration of its Human Authors, 1887
A Handbook to the Epistles of St. Paul, 1887.
Apostolical Succession tested by Holy Scripture, 1895.
The Word of God and the Testimony of Jesus Christ, 1903.
Moses and the Prophets, a Plea for the Authority of Moses in Holy Scripture, 1907: a reply to the Rev. Canon Driver.
Shadows of Redemption
The Silver Sockets
'When Ye Pray' Or, Lessons on Prayer
Path to the City of Gold
Adoption and the Covenant, Some Thoughts on Confirmation
Notes on the Twelve Lesser Prophets
The Greek Text of Westcott and Hort, The Case of the Conservatives
 Every-day Life

Journal articles:
 Waller, Charles Henry. 'Dean Burgon's "Revision Revised",' The Churchman 9.54 (March 1883): 443-450
 Waller, Charles Henry. 'Burgon and Millers "Traditional Text of the Holy Gospels",' The Churchman 10.11 (August 1896): 573-578.

References

19th-century English theologians
19th-century English Anglican priests
1840 births
1910 deaths
People from Ettingshall
Burials in Berkshire